"The Ones Who Walk Away from Omelas"  is a 1973 work of short philosophical fiction by American writer Ursula K. Le Guin. With deliberately both vague and vivid descriptions, the narrator depicts a summer festival in the utopian city of Omelas, whose prosperity depends on the perpetual misery of a single child. "The Ones Who Walk Away from Omelas" was nominated for the Locus Award for Best Short Fiction in 1974 and won the Hugo Award for Best Short Story in 1974.

Plot
The only chronological element of the work is that it begins by describing the first day of summer in Omelas, a shimmering city of unbelievable happiness and delight. In Omelas, the summer solstice is celebrated with a glorious festival and a race featuring young people on horseback. The vibrant festival atmosphere, however, seems to be an everyday characteristic of the blissful community, whose citizens, though limited in their technology and resources, are still intelligent, sophisticated, and cultured. Omelas has no kings, soldiers, priests, or slaves. The specific socio-politico-economic setup of the community is not mentioned; the narrator merely claims not to be sure of every particular.

The narrator reflects that "Omelas sounds in my words like a city in a fairy tale, long ago and far away, once upon a time. Perhaps it would be best if you imagined it as your own fancy bids, assuming it will rise to the occasion, for certainly I cannot suit you all." Everything about Omelas is so abundantly pleasing that the narrator decides the reader is not yet truly convinced of its existence and so elaborates upon the final element of the city: its one atrocity. The city's constant state of serenity and splendor requires that a single unfortunate child be kept in perpetual filth, darkness, and misery.

Once citizens are old enough to know the truth, most, though initially shocked and disgusted, ultimately acquiesce to this one injustice that secures the happiness of the rest of the city. However, some citizens, young and old, walk away from the city after seeing the child. Each is alone, and no one knows where they go, but none come back. The story ends with "The place they go towards is a place even less imaginable to most of us than the city of happiness. I cannot describe it at all. It is possible it does not exist. But they seem to know where they are going, the ones who walk away from Omelas."

Inspiration and themes
Le Guin stated that the city's name is pronounced "OH-meh-lahss". Le Guin hit upon the name of the town on seeing a road sign for Salem, Oregon, in a car mirror. "[… People ask me] 'Where do you get your ideas from, Ms. Le Guin?' From forgetting Dostoyevsky and reading road signs backwards, naturally. Where else?"

"The central idea of this psychomyth, the scapegoat", writes Le Guin, "turns up in Dostoyevsky's Brothers Karamazov, and several people have asked me, rather suspiciously, why I gave the credit to William James. The fact is, I haven't been able to re-read Dostoyevsky, much as I loved him, since I was twenty-five, and I'd simply forgotten he used the idea. But when I met it in James' 'The Moral Philosopher and the Moral Life', it was with a shock of recognition."

The quote from William James is:

Dostoyevsky's original description of the dilemma refers to the doctrine of salvation through the crucifixion of Jesus.

Publication history 
Le Guin's piece was originally published in New Dimensions 3, a hardcover science fiction anthology edited by Robert Silverberg, in October 1973. It was reprinted in Le Guin's The Wind's Twelve Quarters in 1975, and has been frequently anthologized elsewhere. It has also appeared as an independently published, 31-page hardcover book for young adults in 1993.

It was republished in the second volume of the short-story anthology The Unreal and the Real in 2014. Introducing the short work in her 2012 collection The Unreal and the Real, Volume Two, Le Guin noted that "The Ones Who Walk Away from Omelas" "has a long and happy career of being used by teachers to upset students and make them argue fiercely about morality."

Cultural legacy
Game Designers Ricardo Bare and Harvey Smith drew upon "The Ones Who Walk Away from Omelas" as inspiration for the supernatural being of the Outsider in the Dishonored video game series.

In Plotted: A Literary Atlas, artist and author Andrew DeGraff illustrated a map visualizing Le Guin's story. DeGraff wrote that: "Le Guin provides us with the building blocks to construct the city of Omelas, but if we want to forsake it afterward, then we too have to strike out alone."

The 2017 music video for "Spring Day" by South Korean band BTS references Le Guin's short story, both thematically and in displaying a hotel named 'Omelas'.

N. K. Jemisin's 2018 anthology How Long 'til Black Future Month? opens with a piece titled "The Ones Who Stay and Fight", which is a direct response to Le Guin's story. In an interview with The Paris Review, the writer stated that many readers misunderstand Le Guin as arguing that the only way to create a better society is to leave, and that in fact Le Guin was arguing that one has to "fix" their society, "especially when there's nowhere to walk away to." Jemisin's 2022 novel The World We Make makes allusion to the story as well, using the descriptor "Omelasian" in reference to children being captive in a basement. 

In a 2019 Tor.com article, Joe George argued that the 2019 film Us was influenced by both Le Guin's short story as well as Octavia E. Butler's "Speech Sounds".

Catherine Lacey's 2020 novel Pew begins with an epigraph from "The Ones Who Walk Away from Omelas", quoting the last paragraph of the story. The novel itself is heavily tied to Le Guin's work, with several key similarities present.

Executive Producers and co-showrunners Michelle Paradise and Alex Kurtzman cited Le Guin's short story as inspiration for the plot line of the third season of Star Trek: Discovery, with Kurtzman noting that both creators were interested in the central dilemma being solely caused by a child. Several reviewers also noted a strong similarity between the story and the episode "Lift Us Where Suffering Cannot Reach" of Star Trek: Strange New Worlds. One such was Anthony Pascale, who called the episode "almost a beat-for-beat recreation" of Le Guin's work. On the satirical website Cracked, JM McNab pointed out the long history of Le Guin's influence on the Star Trek franchise and that while the writers of Star Trek: Discovery did name a ship after her, the honor is "still not as good as being credited".

References

Sources
 
 
 
 

1974 short stories
Hugo Award for Best Short Story winning works
Short stories by Ursula K. Le Guin
Existentialist short stories